The 5th Light Regiment Royal Regiment of New Zealand Artillery was a unit of the New Zealand Divisional Artillery (Div Arty). It was formed in 1952 to provide each of the division's brigades with a supporting mortar battery. The regiment contained members of both the Territorial and Regular Forces and had its headquarters in Wellington and batteries in Petone, Napier and Gore. It moved to Southland in 1956 and was headquartered in Invercargill. The Regiment was disbanded in 1964 as part of a reorganisation of the New Zealand Army's artillery units.

Affiliations
 – Royal Artillery
 – Royal Canadian Artillery
 – Royal Australian Artillery

References

Artillery regiments of New Zealand
Military units and formations established in 1952
Military units and formations disestablished in 1964